Orloff is a variant of Orlov. Both are derived from the Slavic word orel (meaning "eagle". (disambiguation)) Orloff may refer to:

People 
Orloff M. Dorman (1809–1879), justice of the Supreme Court of Virginia
Ben Orloff (born 1987), minor League Baseball player
Chana Orloff (1888–1968), sculptor
Chet Orloff (born 1949), American historian, writer and professor of urban studies
Gene Orloff (1922 or 1923), American music (violinist, concertmaster, arranger)
Jon Orloff (born 1942), American physicist
Monford Orloff (1914–2000), American businessman and philanthropist
Nicholas W. Orloff, Russian KGB agent in the United States
Judith Orloff, American psychiatrist, author and energy medicine practitioner
Zvi Nishri (Orloff, 1878–1973), Russian/Palestinian/Israeli pioneer in modern physical education
Dr. Orloff, a character in films by Jesús Franco

Other 
Orloff (chicken), a breed of chicken
Orlov (diamond), a large diamond, sometimes known as the "Orloff"
Orloff vodka, a brand of vodka
Veal Orloff, a 19th century dish of Franco-Russian cuisine

See also 
 Orlov (disambiguation)